Jon Bradshaw (1938 – November 25, 1986) was a journalist, author, and contributing editor to Esquire.

Biography 
Bradshaw was born in New York City and graduated from Church Farm School. He also attended Columbia University.

He wrote for the New York Herald Tribune before moving to England to write for Queen, British Vogue, and The Sunday Times before returning to the United States to join the staff of the New York magazine.

He died of a heart attack at the University of California at Los Angeles Medical Center on November 25, 1986, at age 48. His works included a biography on blues singer Libby Holman and books on backgammon and covered the lives of professional gamblers.

Bradshaw was famous for his lifestyle and journalism, and his works were compiled in a 2021 anthology The Ocean Is Closed: Journalistic Adventures and Investigations by biographers Scott Berg and Alex Belth. He was also in a relationship with Anna Wintour before marrying producer Carolyn Pfeiffer. He was called the "Indiana Jones of magazine journalism" by Esquire editor Alex Belth.

References 

Journalists from New York City
Columbia University alumni
1938 births
1986 deaths
New York Herald Tribune people
Esquire (magazine) people
The Sunday Times people
New York (magazine) people
American magazine journalists
Vogue (magazine) people
American biographers